Dry Idea is an American brand of antiperspirant manufactured and sold by Thriving Brands LLC. Introduced in 1978 by Gillette Company, Dry Idea was acquired by The Dial Corporation along with the Soft & Dri and Right Guard brands in 2006 for $420 million as a condition set forth by antitrust authorities for Procter & Gamble's $57 billion acquisition of Gillette. The Dial Corporation was acquired by Henkel in 2003. The brand was acquired by Thriving Brands LLC in June 2021.

Products
Dry Idea antiperspirant deodorants, traditionally unisex, have been around for over three decades.

	Roll-ons (the first product introduced) – 1978
	Aerosols and solids – 1985
	Dry Idea for Men – 1988 (discontinued by the early 1990s)

In the 1980s, Dry Idea was known for its famous commercials starring various celebrities giving advice including the tag line "Never let them see you sweat".  Some of these celebrities included NFL Coach Dan Reeves, fashion designer Donna Karan, Comedian Elayne Boosler and Miss America 1987 Kellye Cash.  An additional commercial included non-celebrity, Miami resident Bob Ozer, who spoke of Dry Idea helping him avoid being "sopping wet" despite his car being recently stolen and work being tough.

References

External links 
 Official website

Personal care brands
Products introduced in 1978